The Hawks is a Dutch baseball club based in Dordrecht. They play their home games at Sportpark Krommedijk. The club currently has roughly 170 members.

The club was founded in 1959 by Daam Hogendijk, a physical education teacher. The team moved to its current facility on the Krommedijk in 1977. The Hawks participated in the Honkbal Hoofdklasse, the top baseball league of the Netherlands, from 2013 to 2015.

References

External links
 KNBSB Dutch baseball and softball association
 Official Website (Dutch)

Sports clubs in Dordrecht
Baseball teams in the Netherlands